"Some Kind of Love" is a 2017 song by the Killers.

Some Kind of Love may also refer to:

 Some Kind of Love (film), a 2015 Canadian documentary directed by Thomas Burstyn
 "Some Kind of Love", a 2021 song by Azure Ryder
 "Some Kind of Love", a song by Dido from the 2019 album Still on My Mind